Novy Mir is a rural locality (a village) in Kabakushsky Selsoviet, Sterlibashevsky District, Bashkortostan, Russia. The population was 28 as of 2010. There is 1 street.

Geography 
Novy Mir is located 23 km south of Sterlibashevo (the district's administrative centre) by road. Kabakush is the nearest rural locality.

References 

Rural localities in Sterlibashevsky District